Belciana is a genus of moths of the family Noctuidae.

Species
 Belciana bicolor Wileman & West, 1929
 Belciana biformis (Walker, 1858)
 Belciana caerulea Hampson, 1926
 Belciana euchlora Hampson, 1926
 Belciana habroscia Prout, 1924
 Belciana kala Prout, 1924
 Belciana kenricki (Bethune-Baker, 1906)
 Belciana particolor Prout, 1924
 Belciana prasina (Swinhoe, 1903)
 Belciana pratti (Bethune-Baker, 1906)
 Belciana serrata (Bethune-Baker, 1906)
 Belciana sophronia Prout, 1924
 Belciana staudingeri (Leech, 1900)
 Belciana subserrata Prout, 1924

References
 Belciana at Markku Savela's Lepidoptera and Some Other Life Forms
 Natural History Museum Lepidoptera genus database

Calpinae
Moth genera